Founded in 1989, the Galerie Patrick Seguin is an art gallery and exhibition space located in Paris's La Bastille district. Its current space has been designed by Ateliers Jean Nouvel. The gallery distributes the creations of designers and architects Jean Prouvé, Charlotte Perriand, Pierre Jeanneret, Le Corbusier, Jean Royere.In this capacity the gallery is urged by museums to contribute to exhibitions, especially:the Centre Georges Pompidou in Paris, MoMA in New York, the Vitra Design Museum in Weil am Rhein, the Museum of Decorative Arts in Paris, the Museum of Fine Arts in Nancy, the Venice Architecture Biennale.

La Galerie Patrick Seguin is present in international fairs: Design Miami, Design Miami Basel, International Biennale des Antiquaires in Paris and the International Contemporary Art Fair (FIAC) in Paris.

Patrick Seguin is an expert close to the National Company of experts2, affiliated to the Syndicat National des Antiquaires and the Committee of Professional Art3 Galleries.

Alongside with a programming dedicated each year at elements like his demountable houses by Jean Prouvé  and which she has now  the largest collection, the gallery Patrick Seguin leads a political of invitation close to the major international contemporary art galleries. These present in the space of Patrick Seguin Gallery in Paris monographic or thematic exhibitions.

Thus, after the Jablonka Gallery in 2002, Hauser & Wirth gallery in 2006, and Richard Prince solo exhibition with Gagosian Gallery in 2008, is the Galerie Eva Presenhuber who invested the space of the gallery Patrick Seguin in 2009, then Sadie Coles gallery in 2010, the gallery Massimo de Carlo in 2011 and Pola Cooper in 2012.

The gallery has also developed an editorial line of monographs (Jean Prouvé, Jean Royere, Le Corbusier, Pierre Jeanneret).

In October 2015, the Galerie Patrick Seguin has opened a second space in London, in the heart of prestigious area of Mayfair - 45-47 Brook Street, alternating exhibitions architectural of design, history and contemporary art, it's a place mainly dedicated to  demountable architectures Jean Prouvé.

Activities 
The gallery distributes the work of designers and architects Jean Prouvé, Charlotte Perriand, Pierre Jeanneret, Le Corbusier, Jean Royère, and is often called on to contribute to exhibitions in such museums as the Centre Georges Pompidou in Paris, MoMA in New York, the Vitra Design Museum in Weil-am-Rhein, and the Musée des Arts Décoratifs of Paris.

Galerie Patrick Seguin is also present at the major international fairs: Design Miami, Design Miami Basel, Biennale Internationale des Antiquaires in Paris and Foire Internationale d’Art Contemporain de Paris (FIAC).
Patrick Seguin is a consultant for the Compagnie Nationale des Experts, affiliated to the
Syndicat National des Antiquaires and the Comité Professionnel des Galeries d’Art.

Bibliography 
 Jean Prouvé Architecture set 5 volumes (5 monographs on Jean Prouve's architecture, editions Gallery Patrick Seguin, Paris 2015) 
 jean Prouvé-Pierre Jeanneret Demountable House BCC (monographs about jean Prouvé, editions  Gallery Patrick Seguin, Paris 2014) 
 Jean Prouvé total filling station (monograph about Jean Prouvé, edition Gallery Patrick Seguin, Paris 2014)
 Jean Prouvé Demountable House 6x6 (éditions Gallery Patrick Seguin, Paris 2013)
 Jean Prouvé Demountable House 8x8 (éditions Gallery Patrick Seguin, Paris 2013)
 Le Corbusier-Pierre Jeanneret Chandigarh, India (edition Gallery Patrick Seguin, Paris 2013)
 Calder-Prouvé (edition Gagosian Gallery & Gallery Patrick Seguin, 2013)
 Calder-Prouvé serie of 10 postcards (edition Gagosian Gallery & Gallery Patrick Seguin, 2013)
 A passion for Jean Prouvé (edition Pinacoteca Giovanni e Marella Agnelli & Gallery Patrick Seguin, 2013)
 Jean Royère (monograph about Jean Royère, editions Gallery Patrick Seguin & Gallery Jacques Lacoste, Paris 2012)
Jean Royère (éditions Galerie Patrick Seguin & Galerie Jacques Lacoste, Paris 2012)
Prouvé/Nouvel-Ferembal House (édition Galerie Patrick Seguin, Paris 2011).
Jean Prouvé (éditions Galerie Patrick Seguin, Paris - Sonnabend Gallery, New York 2007)
 Tadao Ando (edition Enrico Navarra & Gallery Patrick Seguin, 2006)
 L'urgence permanente (edition Enrico Navarra & Gallery Patrick Seguin, 2002)
 Jean Prouvé La Biennale di Venezia (edition Enrico Navarra & Gallery Jousse Seguin, 2000)
 Jean Prouvé (edition Enrico Navarra & Gallery Jousse Seguin,1998)

Notes

References 
 Arch-Times, May 13, 2011
 Jean Nouvel Furniture Gagosian Gallery, March 30, 2011
 Architecture Today , November 4, 2010
 Jean Prouvé: Architecture Gagosian Gallery, October 20, 2010

External links 
 Official website of Galerie Patrick Seguin

Art museums and galleries in Paris
Art galleries established in 1989
1989 establishments in France